Scott O'Neal Sisson (born July 21, 1971) is a former American football placekicker in the National Football League. He played for the New England Patriots (1993) and the Minnesota Vikings (1996). He played collegiately for the Georgia Tech football, including the 1990 national championship team and an All-America selection in 1992. He was inducted into the Georgia Tech Hall of Fame in 2003.

College career
Scott Sisson's most notable kick as a college football player was a field goal which secured Georgia Tech's win over previously #1 ranked Virginia during the UVA homecoming game on November 3, 1990. The win resulted in wild partying on the Georgia Tech campus including spontaneous bonfires, and set the stage for Georgia Tech's #1 ranking as national champions in that season's final UPI poll (with the AP poll going to Colorado), turning Sisson into a campus hero.  Georgia Tech was undefeated that year, having previously tied North Carolina, in contrast to the AP's #1 pick of Colorado which had lost one game that season. Georgia Tech's victory over UVA and Sisson's success on the field brought extra attention to Georgia Tech special teams.

Records
Sisson set a school record of 70 consecutive extra points during his college football career that was passed by Luke Manget during the 2000 football season. Sisson also set a school scoring record for kickers during 1990 football season with 84 points which was also passed by Luke Manget during the 1999 football season. Manget passed this record with 11 field goals and 53 extra points in 1999, vs. Sisson's 15 field goals and 39 extra points in 1990.
Sisson set a record of most field goals made in a season with 19 during 1992 football season, which was matched by Luke Manget during 2001 football season. Sisson also set a school record for most career field goals with 60.

Statistics

Professional career
During his one-year tenure with the Patriots, Sisson had a 53.8% kicking percentage. Patriots fans gave him the name "missin' Sisson"  However, Sisson achieved a 75.9% field goal percentage with the Minnesota Vikings, improving his NFL career average to 65.5%.

See also
 Toe meets leather

References

Living people
1971 births
American football placekickers
Georgia Tech Yellow Jackets football players
Minnesota Vikings players
New England Patriots players
Players of American football from Marietta, Georgia